Kazna Božija (God's Punishment) is the twelfth studio album by Yugoslav pop-folk singer Lepa Brena. It was released 22 December 1994 through the record label Zabava miliona.

This album was sold in a circulation of 150,000 copies.

Track listing

References

1994 albums
Lepa Brena albums
Grand Production albums